Venkataraghavan is a surname of Indian origin. Notable people with the surname include:

Gayathri Venkataraghavan (born before 1993), Indian singer in the Carnatic tradition
Srinivasaraghavan Venkataraghavan (born 1945), Indian international cricketer

Fictional characters:
Kevin Venkataraghavan, character in the television series How I Met Your Mother

See also 
 

Surnames of Indian origin